Coudert is a French surname. Notable people with the surname include:

Amalia Küssner Coudert (1863–1932), American miniaturist
Frederic René Coudert Jr. (1898–1972), American politician
Frederic René Coudert Sr. (1832–1903), American lawyer
Gregoire Coudert, French footballer
Robin Coudert (born 1978), French musician

French-language surnames